The Telly home entertainment server is range of computer systems designed to store, manage, and access all forms of digital media in the home.  Based on Interact-TV's Linux Media Center software, it provides user managed libraries for music, photos, and all forms of video from recorded television programming to DVDs.

Expandable hard drive configurations accommodate growing libraries of home entertainment content and provide an alternative to Desktop and Laptop PCs for entertainment content. Networked configurations distribute content shared from all units throughout a network and allow recording at each location.  Content on Telly systems appears to both Windows and Mac PCs as local networked volumes and can be accessed over the network. The Telly server web site provides management of and access to music, photos, and video.

Telly home entertainment servers use a trackball driven user interface and are offered with full high-definition television (HDTV) outputs, built-in digital video recorder (DVR) capabilities and a variety of other accessories.  As a home entertainment server, Telly systems differ from traditional media center systems in that it is designed from inception to be configured and operated from a TV-based menu, and as a true server, permits integrated file sharing and secure volume managed expandable storage.

Key Features 

 
Telly Servers are available in a range of models from small set-top sized to rack-mount systems.  Each system contains a Linux OS and motherboard and one or more hard drives.  All models may additionally have tuners and CD/DVD burners for both import and archiving owners content.

Video Functionality 
 Users can watch or save DVDs in a Telly server video library for full resolution, progressive scan DVD playback
 Facilities are provided for watching live, delayed or recorded TV, home videos and Internet downloaded video, all of which are stored in the Telly Video Library
 Video Library contents can be viewed and sorted by Cover Art Navigation or In-Depth Program Information
 Music DVDs (such as recorded concerts) in the Video Library can also be copied as music tracks into the Music Library - this permits mixing tracks from music DVD with tracks from the Music Library.
 HD Telly systems upsample the native resolution of recorded TV and regular DVDs from 480i to 720p.
 When users stop any playback of any video, a Resume button is provided to allow any networked Telly server to pick up where it left off
 Telly home entertainment servers support all common non-DRM video formats including AVI, DivX, MPEG-1, MPEG-2 and MPEG-4
 Networking allows users to move media between other Telly systems, PCs or portable media players
 Video files can be imported to Telly from other PCs on the network
 Internet video sources such as YouTube can be played on Telly servers

Music Functionality 
 Jukebox capabilities play single songs or queue any music collection, genre, artist, or album
 Sort the Jukebox looking at traditional lists or album cover art and build collections for playback.
 Created playlists of selected music can be played at any time or burn them on a CD
 Users can view music animations during playback and interleave music DVD tracks from the Video Library
 Users can set the music quality when storing CDs with the built-in CD player including the option of Lossless Audio Encoding (a format that maintains the original CD quality and still creates files that are compressed to save disc space)
 Support is provided for drag and drop music collections from PCs and Macs to Telly server Import Music folder in most popular non-DRM formats including MP3, AAC, and Flac
 Telly systems provide a built-in Web Server allowing any computer to access the Music Library to manage tracks or edit album details
 Telly servers can stream music to any browser
 Telly systems support internet radio playout

Photo Functionality 
 Telly servers scale all photos to fit the connected TV screen and will support full 1080 HDTV resolution for presentation of high quality display of Photo Library contents
 Telly Photo Library contents can be browsed on the TV screen as thumbnails or as automatic or manually advanced slide shows with predetermined playback or random order playback
 The built-in web site access provides the ability to create, add to, and edit Photo Library contents

Networking Functionality 
 Telly Servers can be networked to grow as users' digital media libraries grow - most systems provide 1000/100/10 Base Ethernet connectivity and can be outfitted with wireless or power-line networking capability.
 Each Telly Server can act as a standalone system to manage and access digital media
 Each system provides a set of video and audio outputs to connect directly to a TV (either standard definition or high definition) and audio system
 The analog stereo and digital audio outputs can be connected to a TV's audio input or to an audio receiver with surround sound
 Built-in network sharing provides for access to or copying digital media between your Windows or Mac and Telly servers using any common web browser and network folder sharing including tools like the My Network Places and Macs using Bonjour
 All that entertainment content can be made available to other rooms of the house by adding a TellyVizion Playback Unit to your home network over any Ethernet connection between the Telly Server and the TellyVizion.
 Systems can be configured with a central Telly Server with a TellyVizion as discussed above or by adding a second Telly Server providing the following advantages:
 Two servers double (or more depending on the Telly Server configuration) the amount of storage for digital media.
 Content on each Telly Server can be personalized to exclude shows you don’t want to share with your kids (like The Sopranos) and to exclude shows you don’t care to watch (like The Wiggles), you can keep the content of each server separate by turning off the sharing capability, and content on individual servers can be isolated to prevent accidental deletion
 As time passes and tastes change, users can always turn sharing back on for access the content from any Telly Server on the home network
 With a large digital media libraries, users can further extend storage by adding a TellyRAID system, providing any amount of storage, plus the added protection of RAID in case a hard disk drive fails - TellyRAID connects to one master Telly Server, which then provides the digital media stored on the TellyRAID to other TellyVizions or other Telly Servers throughout the house

TeleMinder 
TellyMinder (Under Development)

The TellyMinder is a small desktop computer designed to fit into any entertainment center and display pre-defined messages on a television screen. TellyMinder has a web-based interface that allows the sender (loved ones, medical professionals, etc.) to enter messages (reminders, detailed instructions or video clips) and then schedule these messages to be displayed at a specified time. Messages can include reminders to take a specific medication at a given time, appointment confirmations, or a simple check-in to see how someone is doing.

Once the message is displayed, the recipient (such as the elderly or shut-ins) can confirm the receipt of the message. If the message receipt is not triggered within a specified timeframe, the sender would receive an e-mail alert to notify them of possible problems so the recipient can be contacted directly.

The TellyMinder will also have a web-cam option so sender can check in on the recipient and get visual feedback on the recipient’s status. Future options include the ability to connect monitoring equipment via TellyMinder’s wireless networking so vital information including heart rate, blood pressure and oxygen levels can be monitored in real time. This would also allow TellyMinder to trigger emergency services if the vital information falls to unsafe levels.

TellyMinder leverages significant intellectual property (IP) rights in the following areas:

User Interface Library that combines broadcast quality graphics, animation and streaming media
Intelligent networked media management system
Enhanced television synchronization implementation over a TCP/IP network
Store and forward streaming of MPEG video over TCP/IP networks
TellyMinder uses a synchronization mechanism based on XML that allows content delivered over the Internet to be coordinated with the display of broadcast television.  This dramatically improves the response time to the user, removing the objectionable download delays which can occur when information is requested over the Internet.

Software Architecture

The following are the core components of the TellyMinder software platform:

tmiGui – This layer of software developed for TellyMinder allows for the design of user interfaces that are television and entertainment centric.  Building on the technical team’s extensive knowledge of broadcast graphics design, a sophisticated user interface toolkit has been developed.

tmiApplicationManager – This software layer developed for TellyMinder provides the management features required by applications such as where windows should be located and how applications should start and stop.

Networked Media Management – TellyMinder has an integrated small and fast database and a newly designed sophisticated, but low maintenance media management system.

Linux Operating System – The Linux OS is the current operating system that TellyMinder is built upon, although all of the current application programming interfaces (APIs) in TellyMinder have been designed to be ported to alternate operating systems if the market dynamics dictate this is necessary.

History 

Corporate Info
Interact-TV, Inc. is a Delaware C Corporation, founded in 2000 by a group of television professionals and was originally headquartered in Westminster, Colorado. Interact-TV, Inc. is currently a public company quoted on the OTC Markets under the symbol ITVI, and headquartered in Delaware.

Interact-TV was formed to develop software products that centralize both the Entertainment and Information experience. Interact-TV products blend Digital Media, Broadband, and Home Networking, then bring it to the end-user through a Television Interface. Interact-TV products focus on the increasing availability of broadband access to the home, and a pervasive demand for higher-value entertainment.

Its initial product, The Telly MC1000 Digital Entertainment Center, began shipping in 2002 as the first fully customizable and expandable digital entertainment system.  This was the first integrated system to allow users to access most forms of digital entertainment including broadband Internet, cable and satellite television, digital audio and video entertainment, and digital home networking.

The Telly home entertainment server product line was continually enhanced and includes a complete line of servers, available through a network of dealers. The Interact-TV Telly product line established a prestigious business‑to‑business customer base including a significant partnership in November 2005 with Turner Broadcasting Systems (TBS) for over 500 Telly product units and special software work for Video‑On‑Demand (VOD) trials and services.

In 2009 Interact-TV, Inc. acquired Viscount Records, Inc. and Viscount Media Trust from the Medley family, in a deal structured by investment banker, Stan Medley. Shortly thereafter, Interact-TV, Inc. transferred all of its Telly properties operations (except for the Telly Minder system which was and is still under development) to JDV Solutions Inc., a spinoff of Interact-TV Inc. Since late 2009, Telly Systems (except for the Telly Minder) have been sold and serviced by JDV Solutions.

Since 2010 Interact-TV, Inc. has shifted its focus more to the production side of entertainment with the formation of Pocket Kid Records, and a Web Channel in 2010. Pocket Kid Records has been operating successfully with the band Dead Sara under contract and has had less success with the development of its Web-Channel and Telly Minder properties.

Home Entertainment Server Market Overview 

Interact-TV introduced their first Telly server in 2001 and was the first commercially available system designed from the ground up as a general purpose home entertainment server.  Built on top of a tuned Linux OS, these servers can run efficiently on energy efficient CPUs.  Many models are fanless for near-silent operation in home entertainment environments or even bedrooms.

Windows Media Center Edition is built on top of a productivity centered operating system which is burdened by inefficient layers of legacy user interface.  This approach confronts users with configuration and operational requirements ill suited to an entertainment oriented experience.  Media Center Edition systems require high performance computing platforms which are usually power hungry and extensively fan cooled.

Apple TV is a solution which utilizes a 'media adapter' approach which places a TV enabled device on the home network to bridge the connection from desktop systems and to provide a conduit for content delivery from their iTunes Store.  A similar 'media adapter' approach is also available for Media Center Edition systems from a variety of manufacturers (i.e. Linksys, Logitek, and others).  Such adaptations arise primarily from the difficulty of creating small quiet computers for lean-back environments which can run full entertainment software on top of lean-forward productivity oriented operating systems.

Operational Requirements 

Telly home entertainment servers require an Internet connection for many features.  Telly systems network over Ethernet to other computers and work with most cable set top boxes and both Dish and Direct-TV satellite via a simple infrared interface.

See also 
Home theater PC
Media center (disambiguation)
Dreambox
Moxi

References

External links
 Interact-TV Inc. web site

Digital television
Digital video recorders
Entertainment companies of the United States
Interactive television
Mass media companies of the United States